is a prefectural museum in the city of Akita, Japan. It houses a comprehensive display of archaeological artifacts, crafts, biological and geological samples pertaining to the history and folklore of Akita Prefecture.

The museum opened in May 1975 and reopened after renovations in April 2004.

See also
 Dewa Province
 Mutsu Province
 List of Historic Sites of Japan (Akita)

References

External links
  Akita Prefectural Museum
  Akita Prefectural Museum

Museums in Akita Prefecture
Buildings and structures in Akita (city)
History museums in Japan
Prefectural museums
Museums established in 1975
1975 establishments in Japan